Geraldine Smith (born February 11, 1949) is an American actress.

Smith was born in Brooklyn, New York. She was discovered by Andy Warhol and Paul Morrissey at Max's Kansas City, a New York nightclub, in the mid-1960s, and was one of the Warhol superstars. She co-starred with Joe Dallesandro in Morrissey's 1968 movie, Flesh, but turned down his next film Trash, reportedly because she did not approve of the title.

She later starred in such Morrissey films as Mixed Blood (1985) and Spike of Bensonhurst (1988). In 1980, she played the minor role of Janet in Martin Scorsese's Raging Bull.

Filmography

References

External links

1949 births
Actresses from New York City
American film actresses
Living people
People from the Bronx
21st-century American women